Lida Buses Neman is a state-owned bus manufacturer located in Lida, Belarus.

History 
The company was founded in May 1984 by the Ministry of Radio Industry of the Soviet Union to produce industrial equipment (assembly and testing machinery) for its parent Association, Agat. In 1988, the plant was designated as a pilot plant to manufacture prototypes. After the dissolution of the Soviet Union, the plant reoriented itself to produce household items (gas burners, electric motors, fans). Since the factory still had unused capacity, it entered into agreement with the Likino Bus Factory (LiAZ) to produce LiAZ-5256 buses. It produced its first bus in 1994. It also produced fire trucks AC-40, buses PAZ-3205, vans GAZelle. In 1998, the company began to produce its own original Neman buses. In June 2011, the company produced its, 1000th bus.

Neman became part of MZKT in 2014

Buses
Main models are:
Neman-5201 (big city)
Neman-52012 (suburban)
Neman-3231 (small class)
Neman-4202 (school bus)

References

External links

 Official website
 Official website of the distributor's plant in the Russian Federation

Vehicle manufacturing companies established in 1984
Bus manufacturers of Belarus
1984 establishments in the Soviet Union
Belarusian brands